All the Best may refer to:

Film
 All the Best: Fun Begins, a 2009 Bollywood comedy film
 All the Best (film), a 2012 Telugu-language film directed by J. D. Chakravarthy

Literature
All the Best (book), a 1999 book by George H. W. Bush
All the Best, a play by Feroz Abbas Khan
"All the Best", can be used as 'Adb' and 'Atb' in slang.

Music

Albums
 All the Best (EMI compilation album series), a series of compilation albums, 2012
 All the Best (Glen Campbell album), 2003
 All the Best (John Paul Young album), 1977
 All the Best (John Williamson album), 1986
 All the Best (Leo Sayer album), 1993
 All the Best!, by Paul McCartney, 1987
 All the Best (Stiff Little Fingers album), 1983
 All the Best (Tina Turner album), 2004
 All the Best – The Live Collection, a DVD by Tina Turner, 2005
 All the Best (Zucchero album), 2007
 All the Best, by Chemistry, 2006
 All the Best, by Cookies, 2003
 All the Best, by Jean-Pierre Danel, 2002
 All the Best, by Joe Pizzulo, 2005
 All the Best, by Tiffany Darwish, 1996
 All the Best! 1999–2009, by Arashi, 2009
 All the Best from Prism, by Prism, 1980
 Sinatra 80th: All the Best, by Frank Sinatra, 1995

Songs
 "All the Best", by John Prine from The Missing Years, 1991